Ptahhotep ( "Peace of Ptah"), sometimes known as Ptahhotep I or Ptahhotpe, was an ancient Egyptian vizier during the late 25th century BC and early 24th century BC Fifth Dynasty of Egypt.

Life
Ptahhotep was the city administrator and vizier (first minister) during the reign of Pharaoh Djedkare Isesi in the Fifth Dynasty. He is credited with authoring The Maxims of Ptahhotep, an early piece of Egyptian "wisdom literature" meant to instruct young men in appropriate behavior.

He had a son named Akhethetep, who was also a vizier. He and his descendants were buried at Saqqara.

Ptahhotep's tomb is located in a mastaba in North Saqqara (Mastaba D62). His grandson Ptahhotep Tjefi, who lived during the reign of Unas, was buried in the mastaba of his father (Mastaba 64). Their tomb is famous for its outstanding depictions. Next to the vizier's titles he held many other important positions, such as overseer of the treasury, overseer of scribes of the king's document, overseer of the double granary and overseer of all royal works.

Mastaba
His mastaba is located at Saqqara. The entrance is on the South-east and decorated with two pillars. It follows a room with two further rooms on each side. The middle of the complex is occupied by a court with ten pillars. Going further north, several other rooms follow with one containing the false door of Ptahhotep and an offering table in front of it. Most walls of the mastaba are decorated with reliefs, but mostly only the lower parts of the scenes are preserved. They are mainly showing offerings bearers. The only family member preserved in the tomb decoration is the son Akhhotep. The name of the wife is not preserved.

The Maxims of Ptahhotep
For a long time it was believed by many scholars that Ptahhotep wrote the first book in history. His book was entitled The Maxims of Ptahhotep. As the Vizier, he wrote on a number of topics in his book that were derived from the central concept of Egyptian wisdom and literature which came from the goddess Maat. She was the daughter of the primordial and symbolized both cosmic order and social harmony. Ptahhotep’s instruction was written as advice to his people in the hopes of maintaining this said "social order". He wrote perspicacious advice covering topics from table manners and proper conduct for success in court circles to handy hints to the husband for preserving his wife’s beauty. Ptahhotep also wrote more social instructions such as ways to avoid argumentative persons and cultivate self-control.

Ptahhotep's grandson, Ptahhotep Tjefi, is traditionally credited with being the author of the collection of wise sayings known as The Maxims of Ptahhotep, whose opening lines attribute authorship to the vizier Ptahhotep: Instruction of the Mayor of the city, the Vizier Ptahhotep, under the Majesty of King Isesi. They take the form of advice and instructions from a father to his son and are said to have been assembled during the late Old Kingdom. However, their oldest surviving copies are written in Middle Egyptian dating to the late First Intermediate Period of the Middle Kingdom. Some scholars have argued that this means that the book was likely composed in the Middle Kingdom and that the authorship is fictional.

The 1906 translation by Battiscombe Gunn, published as part of the "Wisdom of the East" series, was made directly from the Prisse papyrus in Paris, rather than from copies, and is still in print.

A manuscript copy, the Prisse Papyrus, is on display at the Louvre.

References

Bibliography
Nicolas Grimal, A History of Ancient Egypt, Blackwell Publishing, 1992

External links

 "Ptah-Hotep", AfricaWithin.com
Brian Brown (ed.) (1923) The Wisdom of the Egyptians. New York: Brentano's

The Instruction of Ptah-Hotep - AAA Encyclopedia

Overseer of the treasury
Viziers of the Fifth Dynasty of Egypt
Egyptian philosophers
Djedkare Isesi
Ancient Egyptian overseers of royal works
Ancient Egyptian overseers of the granaries